Vihreä Lanka was a political magazine representing the views of the Green League, published eight times per year in Helsinki, Finland. From 1983 to 2016 it was published biweekly in newspaper form. From 2016 Vihreä Lanka  was published as a periodical magazine until December 2019 when it ceased publication.

History and profile
Vihreä Lanka was launched in 1983 and published by Vihreä Lanka Oy. Its publisher was established in 1988. The magazine was headquartered in Helsinki and was published in tabloid format biweekly on Fridays. It was a political publication with an affiliation with the Green League.

Elina Grundström served as the editor-in-chief of Vihreä Lanka between 2006 and 2010. Juha Honkonen was another editor-in-chief of the biweekly.

In 2011 Vihreä Lanka had a checked circulation of 10,200 copies. It was redesigned as a magazine in 2016 to improve its readership. However, this did not work and increase the circulation which was just 10,000 copies. As a result, the magazine and its website was closed in December 2019. In August 2020 the magazine was succeeded by another magazine, Vihreä (Finnish: Green), which was started by the Green League.

See also
 List of magazines in Finland

References

External links
 

1983 establishments in Finland
2019 disestablishments in Finland
Biweekly newspapers
Defunct political magazines published in Finland
Eight times annually magazines
Finnish-language magazines
Publications established in 1983
Magazines disestablished in 2019
Magazines published in Helsinki
Publications disestablished in 2016
Magazines established in 2016
Newspapers published in Helsinki